Faithfully flat may refer to:
 Faithfully flat morphism, in the theory of schemes in algebraic geometry
 Faithfully flat module, for sequences in algebra